Bani Yousef is a sub-district located in the Al-Mawasit District, Taiz Governorate, Yemen. Bani Yousef had a population of 22,013 according to the 2004 census.

Villages
Al-Ayn
 Khonazir
 Al-Maqsos
 Mashrfah
 Al-Akamah
 Qdhaʿ
 Brdad
 Al-Yabon
 Khrʿasah
 ʿAqaf
 Sharar
 Garnat
 Hsmah
 Ad-Dom
 Al-Adiraʿ
 Dhabʿa
 Al-Qihaf
 Al-Thanib
 Al-Manakh
 Hujrah

References

Sub-districts in Al-Mawasit District